Simon Ratcliffe is a South African astronomer known for his promotion of the Square Kilometre Array project. The media have dubbed him the "barefoot astronomer" for his habit of working without shoes.

References

External links
Game changer by Simon Ratcliffe
Simon Ratcliffe: Scale at the Square Kilometer Array 

South African astronomers
Living people
Year of birth missing (living people)